George Frederick Stumpf (December 15, 1910 – March 6, 1993) was a professional baseball outfielder. He played in Major League Baseball (MLB) for the Boston Red Sox (1931–1933) and Chicago White Sox (1936).

Biography
Stumpf's minor league baseball career spanned 1929 to 1948, playing in 2217 total games for a more than 10 different teams.

Stumpf spent parts of four seasons in the major leagues. He appeared in seven games with the Boston Red Sox in 1931, followed by 79 games in 1932, and 22 games in 1933. In his 108 games with the Red Sox, he had a .231 batting average with one home run and 27 RBIs. His lone home run was hit off of Ted Lyons of the Chicago White Sox on August 24, 1932, at Fenway Park in Boston.

Stumpf briefly returned to the majors in 1936, appearing in 10 games with the White Sox, batting .273 (6-for-22) with five RBIs. Of his 118 total MLB appearances, he entered 40 games as a pinch hitter and six games as a pinch runner; he played defensively in 77 games (54 starts), all in the outfield. His overall batting average in MLB was .235; he had five stolen bases.

Stumpf served in the United States Army during World War II. He died in 1993, aged 82, at East Jefferson General Hospital in Metairie, Louisiana.

References

External links
 
 1933 team photo at goreadingberks.com (Stumpf is second-from-left in the front row)
 

Boston Red Sox players
Chicago White Sox players
Major League Baseball outfielders
Baseball players from New Orleans
Hattiesburg Pinetoppers players
Baton Rouge Essos players
Mobile Bears players
Nashville Vols players
Quincy Indians players
Reading Red Sox players
Kansas City Blues players
St. Paul Saints players
Columbus Red Birds players
Houston Buffaloes players
New Orleans Pelicans (baseball) players
New Iberia Pelicans players
1910 births
1993 deaths
United States Army personnel of World War II